Jean-Michel Boucheron (born 6 March 1948) was a member of the National Assembly of France from 1981 to 2012. He represented the 1st constituency of Ille-et-Vilaine in seven consecutive assemblies. He is a member of the Socialiste, radical, citoyen et divers gauche.

He was defeated at the first round of the Legislative Election in 2012 after losing the support of the Socialist Party. The official socialist candidate, Marie-Anne Chapdelaine, was elected.

References

1948 births
Living people
20th-century French politicians
Socialist Party (France) politicians
Deputies of the 12th National Assembly of the French Fifth Republic
Deputies of the 13th National Assembly of the French Fifth Republic